Taibach or Tai-bach is a community and suburban district of Port Talbot, Wales. It is a settlement centered on the main A48 road, sandwiched between the river Ffrwdwyllt and Margam. Parts of Margam are within the community boundaries.

History 
The "little houses" of Taibach sprang up at the beginning of the 19th century in the parish of Margam as homes for colliery and other industrial workers, some way away from the historic village centre of Margam.

With the expansion of industrial activity in the parish, and, in particular, the foundation of the new port at Port Talbot, the whole area became a single conurbation, as it remains, and Taibach was subsumed within it.

Amenities 

The stretch of the A48 road through the area is the main shopping street and is named Commercial Road in the area. Drinking venues in the area were the Surgery pub and The Somerset Arms (locally known as The Sker), which is one of the oldest pubs in the area. The pub also has its own football team.Both are currently closed. 

The area has a Carnegie library and is next to the Talbot Memorial Park, an urban park. In the grounds of the park lies St Theodore's Church. The parish church was built in 1901 by Miss Emily Talbot in honour of Saint Theodore of Tarsus, and in remembrance of her late brother of the same name. The eastern border of the park is formed by the Ffrwdwyllt river. Ffrwdwyllt literally translates to 'wild torrent' in English. The river is popular among local anglers, especially in late autumn.

To the east of the area is the Eastern Primary School, the primary school attended by actor Richard Burton, under his real name of Richard Jenkins. The old Eastern Primary School is now the Taibach Community Education Centre, and was built the same year as Margam Castle in 1831. Taibach has its own Taibach Rugby Club.

The Labour politician and life peer Lord Heycock of Taibach took his title from this area, which had been the home of the Heycock family since about 1800.

Government and politics
Taibach falls within the parliamentary constituency of Aberavon. 

Since the 2022 local elections Taibach has been part of the Margam and Tai-bach electoral ward (including Margam and Margam Moors), which elects three councillors to Neath Port Talbot County Borough Council.

Taibach was the name of the electoral ward for Taibach prior to the 2022 elections, coterminous to the community. The electoral ward of Taibach included the district of Taibach and parts of Margam to the southwest and the village of Goytre to the north.  However, most of the ward is open countryside and woodland spread over a steep hill. 

In the 2017 local council elections, the results were:

In the 2012 local council elections, the electorate turnout was 38.99%.  The results were:

Activiy
SNAC (27 April 1993 – present)

Nearest places
Port Talbot docks
Aberavon
Goytre
Margam
Port Talbot steelworks

See also
Taibach RFC

References

External links 
www.geograph.co.uk : photos of Taibach and surrounding area

Former wards of Neath Port Talbot
Communities in Neath Port Talbot